Margarita Aleksandrovna Drobiazko (born 21 December 1971) is a Russian retired ice dancer. She began competing for Lithuania in 1992 when she teamed up with Povilas Vanagas. With Vanagas, she is the 2000 World bronze medalist, a three-time Grand Prix Final bronze medalist, a two-time European bronze medalist (2000, 2006), the 1999 Skate Canada champion, and competed in five Winter Olympics, finishing as high as 5th.

Career 
Drobiazko began skating at age six – she became interested after seeing children learning to skate at an outdoor rink. She convinced her mother, who wanted her to become a ballerina, to let her try skating. At age 12, she took up ice dancing and was coached first by Natalia Linichuk and then Natalia Dubova. She initially competed with Oleg Granionov for Russia.

Drobiazko was paired with Lithuanian skater Povilas Vanagas by Tatiana Tarasova in Moscow. After the breakup of the Soviet Union, they decided to represent Lithuania. Vanagas said, "It was difficult at the beginning because there was a lot of friction between Russia and Lithuania. Since Rita is Russian, it caused many problems." They moved to Kaunas, Lithuania and began training with Elena Maslennikova. In 1995, they began working also in England with Betty Callaway, Jayne Torvill, and Christopher Dean.

In 1999, Drobiazko and Vanagas began spending time with Elena Tchaikovskaia in Moscow, while continuing to work with Maslennikova in Kaunas. They were also coached by Lilija Vanagiene and Anatoliy Petukhov. Drobiazko and Vanagas retired from competition following the 2001–2002 Olympic season, but returned to competition in 2005 to compete at their fifth Olympics. In preparation for the 2005–2006 season, they worked with Maslennikova, Rostislav Sinicyn, Igor Shpilband, Marina Zueva, Gintaras Svistunavicius, and David Liu, in the United States, Germany, Russia, and Lithuania. Drobiazko and Vanagas became the first and only figure skaters to compete at five Olympics. They retired again in 2006 following the World Championships.

Their choreographers included Elena Maslennikova, Jayne Torvill and Christopher Dean, Elena Tchaikovskaia, Tatiana Pomerantseva, Elena Kholina, Yuri Puzakov, Vasily Kleimenov, and Gintaras Svistunavicius.

Personal life 
Drobiazko was born in Moscow, but lived in Magadan, the Russian far north-east, until the age of six. Since the Olympics require citizenship of the country represented, Drobiazko obtained Lithuanian citizenship in 1993. She has been married to Vanagas since June 2000.

In the summer of 2022, during the Russian invasion of Ukraine, Drobiazko played a role in a ballet Swan Lake on ice with Vanagas in Sochi that was organized by the Kremlin. On August 10, Lithuania's president Gitanas Nausėda signed a decree stripping off the Order of the Lithuanian Grand Duke Gediminas from both skaters.

Programs 
(with Povilas Vanagas)

Competitive highlights 
(ice dance with Povilas Vanagas)

References

External links 

 Drobiazko & Vanagas – Official website 
 
 Care to Ice Dance? – Drobiazko & Vanagas

1971 births
Living people
European Figure Skating Championships medalists
Figure skaters at the 1992 Winter Olympics
Figure skaters at the 1994 Winter Olympics
Figure skaters at the 1998 Winter Olympics
Figure skaters at the 2002 Winter Olympics
Figure skaters at the 2006 Winter Olympics
Lithuanian female ice dancers
Lithuanian people of Russian descent
Olympic figure skaters of Lithuania
Figure skaters from Moscow
World Figure Skating Championships medalists
Universiade medalists in figure skating
Universiade silver medalists for Lithuania
Competitors at the 1993 Winter Universiade